Gilgoen Parish is a civil parish of Gregory County, New South Wales.

The path of totality for the solar eclipse of October 14, 2042 will pass over the parish.

References

Parishes of Australia
Parishes of New South Wales